Papaver quintuplinervium, the harebell poppy, is a species of flowering plant in the family Papaveraceae, native to China. As its synonym Meconopsis quintuplinervia it has gained the Royal Horticultural Society's Award of Garden Merit.

References

quintuplinervium
Endemic flora of China
Flora of North-Central China
Flora of Qinghai
Flora of South-Central China
Flora of Tibet
Plants described in 2018